Super Hits is a budget-priced ten-track compilation that features Europe's two biggest hits selected by producer Bruce Dickinson (not to be confused with the Iron Maiden vocalist) "The Final Countdown" and "Carrie", but neglects the lesser-known "Rock the Night" and "Superstitious" in favor of a selection of album tracks and failed singles. The album was geared towards casual fans who want two big hits in one collection.

Track listing 
All songs were written by Joey Tempest, except where noted.

Personnel 
Joey Tempest – vocals (all tracks), piano on "Tomorrow", keyboards on "Open Your Heart"
John Norum – guitar, backing vocals (tracks 1, 3-6)
Kee Marcello – guitar, backing vocals (tracks 2, 7-10)
John Levén – bass (all tracks)
Mic Michaeli – keyboards, backing vocals (tracks 1-5, 7-10)
Ian Haugland – drums, backing vocals (tracks 1-5, 7-10)
Tony Reno – drums (track 6)

References 

Europe (band) compilation albums
1999 greatest hits albums
Columbia Records compilation albums